Terence Langley Higgins, Baron Higgins,  (born 18 January 1928) is a British Conservative Party politician and Commonwealth Games silver medalist winner for England. He also competed in the men's 400 metres at the 1952 Summer Olympics.

Biography
Born in 1928, Higgins was educated at Alleyn's School, Dulwich. He served in the Royal Air Force from 1946 to 1948, and was a member of British Olympic Team in 1948 and 1952. In 1948 he emigrated to New Zealand, where he worked for a shipping firm, but seven years later returned to Britain to study economics as a mature student at Gonville and Caius College, Cambridge. During his time at Cambridge, Higgins was President of the Cambridge Union. After graduating in 1958, he spent a year as an economics lecturer at Yale University before choosing to work for Unilever as an economist.

Higgins was the Member of Parliament for Worthing from 1964 to 1997, and Financial Secretary to the Treasury between 1972 and 1974. He became a Privy Councillor in 1979, and served on the Treasury Select Committee from 1979 to 1992 (serving as chairman from 1983 to 1992), and on the Liaison Committee from 1984 to 1997.

Higgins was created a life peer as Baron Higgins, of Worthing in the County of West Sussex on 28 October 1997. While in opposition, he served as the Conservative shadow minister for work and pensions in the House of Lords. He was appointed a Knight Commander of the Order of the British Empire in the 1993 New Years Honours List.

His wife, Dame Rosalyn Higgins, with whom he has two children, was the President of the International Court of Justice. Higgins retired from the House of Lords on 1 January 2019.

References

External links 
 
 
 
 

1928 births
Living people
English male sprinters
Conservative Party (UK) MPs for English constituencies
British male sprinters
British sportsperson-politicians
Royal Air Force officers
Conservative Party (UK) life peers
Life peers created by Elizabeth II
Alumni of Gonville and Caius College, Cambridge
Presidents of the Cambridge Union
Knights Commander of the Order of the British Empire
UK MPs 1964–1966
UK MPs 1966–1970
UK MPs 1970–1974
UK MPs 1974
UK MPs 1974–1979
UK MPs 1979–1983
UK MPs 1983–1987
UK MPs 1987–1992
UK MPs 1992–1997
Higgins, Terence Higgins, Baron
Athletes (track and field) at the 1950 British Empire Games
Commonwealth Games silver medallists for England
Commonwealth Games medallists in athletics
People educated at Alleyn's School
Athletes (track and field) at the 1952 Summer Olympics
Olympic athletes of Great Britain
Politicians awarded knighthoods
Deputy Lieutenants of West Sussex
Medallists at the 1950 British Empire Games